The McNeese Cowboys basketball team represents McNeese State University in Lake Charles, Louisiana, United States. The school's team currently competes in the Southland Conference.

They are led by head coach Will Wade  and play their home games at The Legacy Center. Currently members of the NCAA Division I, they were national champions of the NAIA in 1956.

Postseason appearances

NCAA Division I Tournament
The Cowboys have appeared in two NCAA Division I Tournaments. Their combined record is 0–2.

NCAA Division II Tournament
The Cowboys have appeared in one NCAA Division II Tournament. Their record is 0–2.

NAIA Tournament
The Cowboys have appeared in one NAIA Tournament. Their record is 5–0. They were national champions in 1956, their only appearance in the tournament.

NIT
The Cowboys have appeared in three National Invitation Tournaments (NIT). Their combined record is 1–3.

CIT
The Cowboys have appeared in one CollegeInsider.com Postseason Tournament (CIT). Their record is 0–1.

Retired numbers

See also
List of NCAA Division I men's basketball programs

References

External links
Website